CCRE may refer to:

CCRE-CEMR, Council of European Municipalities and Regions
Canadian Council for Research in Education
Caribbean Coral Reef Ecosystems Program

See also
ccREL